1380 Volodia is a carbonaceous background asteroid from the outer region of the asteroid belt. It was discovered on 16 March 1936, by French astronomer Louis Boyer at the North African Algiers Observatory in Algeria. Five nights later, Volodia was independently discovered by Eugène Delporte at Uccle in Belgium.

Orbit and classification 

This C-type asteroid orbits the Sun at a distance of 2.8–3.5 AU once every 5 years and 7 months (2,045 days). Its orbit has an eccentricity of 0.10 and an inclination of 10° with respect to the ecliptic. Volodias observation arc begins with its official discovery at Johannesburg, as no precoveries were taken, and no prior identifications were made.

Naming 

This minor planet is named for Russian Vladimir Vesselovsky (b. 1936), who was born on the night of the asteroid's discovery. "Volodia" is the diminutive of "Vladimir". In 1955, its naming citation was first published by Paul Herget in The Names of the Minor Planets.

Physical characteristics 

In the SDSS-based taxonomy, Volodia is a dark D-type asteroid, which is common in the outer main-belt and among the Jupiter trojan population.

Rotation period 

In April 2008, a fragmentary light-curve of Volodia was obtained from photometric observations by astronomer Eric Barbotin. Light-curve analysis gave a tentative rotation period of 8 hours with a change in brightness of 0.15 magnitude.

Diameter and albedo 

According to the survey carried out by NASA's Wide-field Infrared Survey Explorer with its subsequent NEOWISE mission, Volodia measures between 21.76 and 23.27 kilometers in diameter, and its surface has an albedo between 0.074 and 0.090. The Collaborative Asteroid Lightcurve Link assumes an albedo of 0.058 and calculates a diameter of 24.09 kilometers based on an absolute magnitude of 11.8.

References

External links 
 Lightcurve Database Query (LCDB), at www.minorplanet.info
 Dictionary of Minor Planet Names, Google books
 Asteroids and comets rotation curves, CdR – Geneva Observatory, Raoul Behrend
 Discovery Circumstances: Numbered Minor Planets (1)-(5000) – Minor Planet Center
 
 

001380
Discoveries by Louis Boyer (astronomer)
Named minor planets
19360316